The GE 645 mainframe computer was a development of the GE 635 for use in the Multics project. This was the first computer that implemented a configurable hardware protected memory system. The original CTSS was implemented on a modified IBM 7094 with two banks of memory and bank-switching between user and supervisor mode, i.e. programs running in the A-core memory bank had access to instructions that programs running in the B-core bank did not. The Multics operating system implemented multilevel security (MLS) on a GE 635 by running a simulator of the 645 starting on October 18, 1965, in the MIT Tech Center. This simulated environment was replaced by the first 645 hardware in 1967. The GECOS operating system was fully replaced by Multics in 1969 with the Multics supervisor (master mode now known as kernel mode) separated by protection rings with "gates" allowing access from user mode. A later generation in the form of the 645F (F for follow-on) wasn't completed by the time the division was sold to Honeywell, and became known as the Honeywell 6180. The original access control mechanism of the GE/Honeywell 645 were found inadequate for high speed trapping of access instructions and the re-implementation in the 6180 solved those problems. The bulk of these computers running time-sharing on Multics were installed at the NSA and similar governmental sites. Their usage was limited by the extreme security measures and had limited impact on subsequent systems, other than the protection ring.

The hardware protection introduced on this computer and modified on the 6180 was later implemented in the Intel 286 computer processor as a four-layer protection ring, but four rings was found to be too cumbersome to program and too slow to operate. Protection ring architecture is now used only to protect kernel mode from user mode code just as it was in the original use of the 645.

References

External links
GE-645 Circuit Board

600
Transistorized computers
36-bit computers
Computer-related introductions in 1967
Time-sharing